Vanzant is an unincorporated community in Breckinridge County, Kentucky, United States.

References

Unincorporated communities in Breckinridge County, Kentucky
Unincorporated communities in Kentucky